Lyden is an unincorporated community and census-designated place in Rio Arriba County, New Mexico, United States. Its population was 245 as of the 2010 census. The community is located on the west bank of the Rio Grande. It was formerly known as "El Bosque." A post office operated in Lyden between 1902 and 1957.

Geography

Demographics

Education
It is in Española Public Schools. The comprehensive public high school is Española Valley High School.

References

Census-designated places in New Mexico
Census-designated places in Rio Arriba County, New Mexico
New Mexico populated places on the Rio Grande